The Johari window is a technique designed to help people better understand their relationship with themselves and others. It was  created by psychologists Joseph Luft (1916–2014) and Harrington Ingham (1916–1995) in 1955, and is used primarily in self-help groups and corporate settings as a heuristic exercise. Luft and Ingham named their model "Johari" using a combination of their first names.

Description
In the exercise, someone picks a number of adjectives from a list, choosing ones they feel describe their own personality. The subject's peers then get the same list, and each picks an equal number of adjectives that describe the subject. These adjectives are then inserted into a two-by-two grid of four cells.

Charles Handy calls this concept the Johari House with four rooms. Room one is the part of ourselves that we and others see. Room two contains aspects that others see but we are unaware of. Room three is the private space we know but hide from others. Room four is the unconscious part of us that neither ourselves nor others see.

The four quadrants 

 Open 
The open area is that part of our conscious self – our attitudes, behavior, motivation, values, way of life – that we are aware of and that is known to others. We move within this area with freedom. We are "open books".
 
Façade/hidden
Adjectives selected by the subject, but not by any of their peers, go in this quadrant. These are things the peers are either unaware of, or that are untrue but for the subject's claim.

Blind
Adjectives not selected by subjects, but only by their peers go here. These represent what others perceive but the subject does not.

Unknown
Adjectives that neither the subject nor the peers selected go here. They represent the subject's behaviors or motives that no one participating recognizes – either because they do not apply or because of collective ignorance of these traits.

Johari adjectives 
The participant can use adjectives like these as possible descriptions in the Johari window.  

able
accepting
adaptable
bold
brave
calm
caring 
cheerful
clever
complex 
confident
dependable
dictate
empathetic
energetic
extroverted
friendly
giving
happy
helpful
idealistic
independent
ingenious
intelligent
introverted
kind
knowledgeable
logical
loving
mature
modest
nervous
observant
organized
patient
powerful
proud
quiet
reflective
relaxed
religious
responsive
searching
self-assertive
self-conscious
sensible
sentimental
shy
silly
smart
spontaneous
sympathetic
tense
trustworthy
warm
wise
witty

Motivational equivalent 
The concept of meta-emotions categorized by basic emotions offers the possibility of a meta-emotional window as a motivational counterpart to the meta-cognitive Johari window.

Therapy
One therapeutic target may be the expansion of the Open (Arena) square at the expense of both the Unknown square and the Blind Spot square, resulting in greater knowledge of oneself, while voluntary disclosure of Private (Hidden or Facade) squares may result in greater interpersonal intimacy and friendship.

See also

 
 
 There are known knowns – A phrase, where its opposite, unknown unknowns, was created with the Johari window

References

Further reading 
 Kormanski, Luethel M. Using the Johari Window to Study Characterization - JSTOR. 1988, https://www.jstor.org/stable/40029904. 
 Newstrom, John W., and Stephen A. Rubenfeld (1983). “The Johari Window: A Reconceptualization.” Developments in Business Simulation and Experiential Learning: Proceedings of the Annual ABSEL Conference, https://journals.tdl.org/absel/index.php/absel/article/view/2298.

External links 

 Noogenesis article on the Johari Window, Examples of window-altering actions; game theory aspects.
 Online Johari Window tool, by Kevan Davis
 Johari Window - downloadable application - Fox Valley Technical College

1955 introductions
Personality tests